Battle of Kharkiv may refer to:

 Kharkiv Operation (June 1919)
 Battle of Kharkov, four battles in World War II
 First Battle of Kharkov, an October 1941 battle
 Second Battle of Kharkov, a May 1942 battle
 Third Battle of Kharkov, a February 1943 battle
 Belgorod-Kharkov Offensive Operation (also known as Fourth Battle of Kharkov), an August 1943 battle
 Battle of Kharkiv (2022), starting in February during the 2022 Russian invasion of Ukraine
 2022 Ukrainian Kharkiv counteroffensive, starting in September 2022

See also
Kharkiv Operation (disambiguation)
Occupation of Kharkiv (disambiguation)
Kharkiv (disambiguation)
Kharkov (disambiguation)